Tar Sands Blockade is a grassroots coalition of affected Texas and Oklahoma people and climate justice organizers who use peaceful and sustained civil disobedience to stop the Keystone XL tar sands pipeline.
Tar Sands Blockade used nonviolent direct action to stop construction of the pipeline throughout East Texas including banner drops, lockdowns, and tree sits.
They are best known for a large scale tree sit outside Winnsboro, Texas.

Naomi Klein attributes the origin of the term Blockadia, which describes a global anti-extractivist movement to the hour-long documentary Blockadia Rising (2013) that Tar Sands Blockade produced to describe the dangers of tar sands extraction and highlight their direct actions. 

The group occupied blockades for 86 days in 2012, forcing TransCanada to reroute the pipeline.

Political and environmental issues 

TransCanada, a multinational corporation, was building the Gulf Coast Project section of the Keystone XL with the go ahead from the Obama administration in 2012.
This section of the pipeline passed from Oklahoma through East Texas into the Gulf. Anti-pipeline activists and environmental organizations claimed that probable pipe spillage would threaten groundwater, ecosystems, surrounding lands, employment, and the  economy.  The pipeline would cross 631 streams and wetlands in Texas, including not the Sulphur River and the entire Carrizo-Wilcox Aquifer, which is the water supply for 12 million homes in East Texas.

A whistleblower, Evan Vokes, came forward about TransCanada in mid-October, 2012, to confirm allegations of regulatory non-compliance.

See also 

 Keystone XL pipeline
 Carrizo-Wilcox Aquifer
 Tree sitting
Line 3 Pipeline

References 

Bituminous sands
Environmental movements
Environmental organizations based in the United States
Nonviolent occupation
Environmental organizations established in 2012
2012 establishments in the United States
Protests in Texas